Scott Simon (born December 9, 1948 in Kansas City, Missouri), also known as Screamin' Scott Simon, is an American pianist, who had been Sha Na Na's piano-player, from April 1970 until the bands disbandment on December 5 2022.

Early Life and Education 

Simon was born in Missouri. He graduated from Southwest High School in Kansas City, Missouri, in 1966, and graduated from Columbia University with a B.A. in 1970.

Sha Na Na 
Simon joined Sha Na Na in April of 1970, under the name Screamin' Scott Simon. He has written numerous songs that have been recorded by the band and others over the years. 

Sha Na Na, who are known for covering 1950s Rock and Roll and doo-wop, appeared as a 1950s version of theirselves in the 1978 film version of Grease. In the film, he and Louis St. Louis collaborated on the song "Sandy", performed by John Travolta.

Scott Simon continued to tour with Sha Na Na, Along with founding members Jocko Marcellino, until December 5 2022, when it was announced that Sha Na Na would no longer be touring. During his time in Sha Na Na, he played on every album, with the exception of their first album, which was released in 1969.

Discography 

 Sha Na Na (1971)
 The Night Is Still Young (1972)
 The Golden Age of Rock ’n’ Roll (1973)
 From the Streets of New York (live) (1973)
 Hot Sox (1974)
 Sha Na Now (1975)
 Rock 'n Roll Graffiti – Live in Japan (1975)
 Rockin' in the 1980s (1980)
 Silly Songs (1981)
 34th & Vine (1990)
 Live in Concert (1996)
 Rock 'n Roll Dance Party (1996)
 Then He Kissed Me (1999)
 Live in Japan (2000)
 Rockin' Christmas (2002)
 One More Saturday Night (2006)

References 

1948 births
Living people
American rock pianists
American male pianists
Sha Na Na members
20th-century American pianists
21st-century American pianists
20th-century American male musicians
21st-century American male musicians

Columbia College (New York) alumni